The 2021 Conservative Party of Quebec leadership election took place on April 17, 2021 to elect a leader to replace Adrien D. Pouliot, who tendered his resignation on October 16, 2020 to focus on his business ventures. The election was won by radio host and columnist Éric Duhaime.

Background

Adrien Pouliot announced on Facebook that he would be resigning as party leader on October 16, 2020, to pursue further business ventures. Pouliot remained party leader until the new leader was chosen.

Timeline

2020
October 16 – Adrien Pouliot announces his pending resignation as Leader of the Conservative Party of Quebec.
October 20 – The Leadership Contest Organization Committee (LEOC) is announced.
October 27 – The official rules of the election are released.
November 11 – Daniel Brisson declares his candidacy.
November 22 – Éric Duhaime declares his candidacy.
December 16 – First deadline to raise $1,500 as part of the entry fee.
December 17 – Last day to register as a candidate.

2021
February 17 – Second and final deadline to raise $5,000 as part of the entry fee.
March 2 – The first debate between Éric Duhaime and Daniel Brisson is held.
March 15 – Last day to become an eligible party member.
March 16 – Voting opens electronically and by mail.
March 31 – The second debate between Éric Duhaime and Daniel Brisson is held.
April 17 – 
Voting closes.
The results are announced.

Debates

Candidates

Daniel Brisson
 
Daniel Brisson is an IT specialist who was a contender in the 2013 leadership election. Brisson ran in Vanier-Les Rivières in 2012, was the Alliance citoyenne candidate for mayor in Quebec City in 2017, and was the People's Party of Canada candidate in Louis-Hébert in 2019.

Candidacy announced: November 11, 2020
Date registered with Élections Québec:

Éric Duhaime

Éric Duhaime, 51, is a political pundit, journalist and former political advisor. Prior to entering politics, Duhaime worked as a radio host on 98,5 FM, and was an advisor to politicians such as Stockwell Day, the then-leader of the Canadian Alliance, Mario Dumont, the then-leader of the Action démocratique du Québec, and Gilles Duceppe, the then-leader of the Bloc Québécois.

Candidacy announced: November 22, 2020
Date registered with Élections Québec:
Campaign website:

Declined to run
Frank Dumas, businessman
Maxime Bernier, leader of the People's Party of Canada; former federal Conservative cabinet minister; former MP for Beauce
Nicolas Gagnon, spokesperson for Québec Fier
Yaakov Pollak, 2018 candidate in Mont-Royal–Outremont

Results

Notes

References

Conservative
Elections in Quebec
2021 elections in Canada
Conservative Party of Quebec leadership election